Dileepan (born Dileepan Arunasalam) is an Indian actor, currently working in the Tamil film industry. He made his film debut with the 2013 film, Vathikuchi.

Early life and family
Dileepan was born in Kallakurichi, Tamil Nadu. He is the younger brother of renowned film director, A. R. Murugadoss.

Career
Dileepan made his debut as the protagonist in his brother's production film, Vathikuchi, opposite Anjali. The film, which revolves around an auto rickshaw driver who gets involved with gangsters and his life takes a turn for the worse, was released on 15 March 2013 to positive reviews from critics.

Dileepan achieved success in his next venture, Kaala, directed by Pa. Ranjith. Dileepan portrayed the role of Rajinikanth's elder son Selvam, who joins his father Kaala in the crusade against land eviction in Dharavi, Mumbai. Kaala was released on 7 June 2018, to a mixed to positive reception from critics.

Filmography
All films are in Tamil, unless otherwise noted.

References

External links
 

Living people
Indian male film actors
Male actors in Tamil cinema
Year of birth missing (living people)